Don Paul "Suds" Sutherin (February 29, 1936 – January 11, 2022) was a Canadian Football League (CFL) and National Football League (NFL) defensive back and placekicker.  He is a member of the Canadian Football Hall of Fame (1992).

Playing career
Sutherin played college football at Ohio State, and kicked the game-winning field goal in the 1958 Rose Bowl, giving Ohio State its third national championship. He was drafted by the New York Giants in the eighth round of the 1959 NFL Draft and played in the NFL from 1959-1960 for the Giants and the Pittsburgh Steelers.

Sutherin started his playing career with Hamilton Tiger-Cats in 1958.  After playing in the NFL, he returned to Hamilton in 1960, where he would play seven more seasons.  He played for the Ottawa Rough Riders from 1967–1969 and the Toronto Argonauts in 1970. For Hamilton, his highest number of interceptions was 11 in 1961, 8 in 1962, and 6 in 1964 and for Toronto, 10 in 1969, for a total of 58 interceptions and 3 touchdowns.  He spent a total of 12 years as a player in the CFL and played in eight Grey Cups, winning four.

While with the Tiger-Cats, he was noted for being both a defensive back as well as a placekicker and he led the CFL in points for several years.

Sutherin was honoured on the Hamilton Tiger-Cats' Wall of Fame at Ivor Wynne Stadium on October 24, 2008.

Coaching career
After his playing career, Don Sutherin was an assistant coach with the Edmonton Eskimos from 1985 to 1990, the Calgary Stampeders from 1992 to 1994, and the Hamilton Tiger-Cats from 1994 to 2002. He was promoted to head coach of the Hamilton Tiger-Cats in 1994 and remained in that role until 1997.

Personal life and death
Sutherin died in Canton, Ohio, on January 11, 2022, at the age of 85.

CFL coaching record

References

External links
 Don Sutherin entry on the Canadian Football Hall of Fame website

1936 births
2022 deaths
American football defensive backs
American football placekickers
American players of Canadian football
Canadian football defensive backs
Canadian football placekickers
Canadian Football Hall of Fame inductees
Edmonton Elks coaches
Hamilton Tiger-Cats coaches
Hamilton Tiger-Cats general managers
Hamilton Tiger-Cats players
New York Giants players
Ohio State Buckeyes football players
Ottawa Rough Riders players
People from Jefferson County, Ohio
Pittsburgh Steelers players
Players of American football from Ohio
Toronto Argonauts players
NFL Europe (WLAF) coaches